Ebrahim Yazdan Panah (7 November 1938 – 9 March 2014) was an Iranian middle-distance runner. He competed in the men's 800 metres at the 1964 Summer Olympics.

References

1938 births
2014 deaths
Athletes (track and field) at the 1964 Summer Olympics
Iranian male middle-distance runners
Olympic athletes of Iran
Place of birth missing